was a yuri manga anthology magazine published quarterly by Japanese publisher Sun Magazine.The magazine existed between June 2003 and November 2004. It was part of what still is a small niche market, with only a few manga magazines in Japan that specializes in the yuri (i.e. lesbian-themed) genre. The magazine also contained one-shots and light novels. The magazine was discontinued in November 2004 with the fifth volume. The magazine's cover illustrations were done by Reine Hibiki, the illustrator of the yuri light novel series Maria-sama ga Miteru.

The magazine was revived as Comic Yuri Hime by Ichijinsha in July 2005, with many of the same manga authors returning.

Issues

References

2003 establishments in Japan
2004 disestablishments in Japan
Defunct magazines published in Japan
Quarterly manga magazines published in Japan
Magazines established in 2003
Magazines disestablished in 2004
Yuri (genre) manga magazines